Streets of Glory is a 6-issue western comic book mini-series written by Garth Ennis and illustrated by Mike Wolfer. It was published by Avatar Press, and the first issue was released in September 2007.

Collected editions
The series has been collected into a single volume:

Streets of Glory (160 pages, softcover, February 2009, hardcover, March 2009)

Notes

References

Comics by Garth Ennis